Xingtian Temple is a metro station in Taipei, Taiwan served by the Taipei Metro. The station opened on 3 November 2010. This station is named after the Xingtian Temple, but other places near the station such as the Xingtian Temple Market and Songjiang Market are also notable. The station will be a planned transfer for the Minsheng–Xizhi line.

Station overview
This three-level, underground station has an island platform and has four exits. It is located beneath the intersection of Minsheng East Rd. and Jinzhou Street, and opened on 3 November 2010 with the opening of the Luzhou Branch Line and the Taipei City section of the Xinzhuang Line. The station serves over 15,000 passengers per day and is the busiest station on the Xinzhuang Line.

Construction
Excavation depth for this station is around 25 meters. It is 157 meters in length and 25 meters wide. It has four entrances, one accessibility elevator, and two vent shafts. Three of the entrances are integrated with joint development buildings, while the other is connected with an existing sidewalk. Following , Xingtian Temple is only the second station to have three joint development sites. The station is equipped with platform screen doors.

Station layout

Exits	
The station has four exits.

Around the station	
Xingtian Temple
Broadcasting Corporation of China Songjiang Building
Zhongshan District Administrative Center
Songjiang Market
The Inn of the Sixth Happiness (between this station and Songjiang Nanjing Station)
Taipei Municipal Datong High School
Central News Agency
Evergreen Marine Corporation Building
Evergreen Chinese Medicine Clinic

Public Art
Taking into account the nearby Xingtian Temple, the station has the "Eight Generals" (八家將; bajiajiang) masks and tiles as public art displays. Due to the anticipated passenger traffic through the station, the art displays were constructed out of ceramics for easier maintenance and protection from accidents.

References

Zhonghe–Xinlu line stations
Railway stations opened in 2010